Robert William Prittie (December 5, 1919 – January 14, 2002) was a Canadian politician. He was a New Democrat Member of Parliament from Burnaby—Richmond from 1962 to 1968 and mayor of Burnaby, British Columbia from 1969 to 1973.

The Metrotown branch of the Burnaby Public Library is named after him.

References

External links
 
 Burnaby City Hall: Robert W. Prittie

1919 births
2002 deaths
Mayors of Burnaby
Members of the House of Commons of Canada from British Columbia
New Democratic Party MPs
University of British Columbia alumni